The 1996 Arab Super Cup was an international club competition played by the winners and runners up of the Arab Club Champions Cup and Arab Cup Winners' Cup. It was the third edition of the tournament to be played. Espérance de Tunis were crowned champions, with Saudi Arabian outfit Al-Riyadh runner up. Also represented were Al-Hilal, also of Saudi Arabia. It is unclear why Al-Riyadh took part in the competition as they weren't represented as either champions or runners up of the Arab Club Champions Cup or Arab Cup Winners' Cup.

Teams

Results and standings

Awards
Fairplay team: Al-Riyadh

References

External links
Arab Super Cup 1996 - rsssf.com

1996
1996
1995–96 in Saudi Arabian football